Akram Abd Rabo, born December 26, 1992) is an Egyptian football striker who currently plays from Egyptian Second Division club Pharco FC.

External links
 

1992 births
Living people
Egyptian footballers
Al Ittihad Alexandria Club players
Pharco FC players
Association football forwards